Disciple is the fifth album released by Christian rock group Disciple, on June 7, 2005. When the single "The Wait is Over" was released, it broke several records in Christian music, including the longest spot at No. 1 on the R&R Charts.

A special edition was released on June 6, 2006 as a DualDisc containing four bonus songs and a making-of DVD. The covers between the two albums differ only in the background color but are otherwise identical.

Track listing

 The bonus tracks were also released as an EP titled Things Left Unsaid.

'DualDisc special edition side two
 "Day in the Life"
 Individual band interviews including producer commentary

Personnel 

Based on AllMusic credits:
 Kevin Young – vocals
 Brad Noah – guitar
 Tim Barrett – drums
 Joey Fife – bass
 Travis Wyrick – audio engineer, audio production, editing, engineer, loops, mixing, programming
 Mike Dearing – assistant engineer, editing, percussion
 Jeremy Cowart – photography

Chart positions

Awards
In 2006, the album was nominated for a Dove Award for Rock Album of the Year at the 37th GMA Dove Awards. The song "The Wait Is Over" was also nominated for Rock Recorded Song of the Year.

References

2005 albums
Disciple (band) albums
INO Records albums
Albums produced by Travis Wyrick